Colin Vint (born November 20, 1984) is an American former professional soccer player who most recently played as a forward.

Career
Vint was born in Bethesda, Maryland. He is a graduate of Chantilly High School and began his soccer career in college, where he played for the University of Richmond Spiders. In four years he played 71 games and was a member of the 2002 Atlantic 10 All-Rookie Team and 2003–2005 All-Conference Teams, as well as the National Soccer Coaches Association of America (NSCAA) South Atlantic Region All-American in 2003 and 2005.

He was signed by League of Ireland side Bray Wanderers in the summer of 2006.  Vint netted seven goals in six appearances for the U-21s, and garnered three starts for the first team before a fractured cheekbone sidelined him.  In total he made five first team appearances.

In December 2006, Vint signed with the German club SV Henstedt-Rhen, where he made his debut in January 2007 to the tune of two goals and one assist in a 4–2 victory over VfL 93 Hamburg.

References

External links 
Colin Vint Highlights Clip 1
Colin Vint Highlights Clip 2

1984 births
Living people
League of Ireland players
Bray Wanderers F.C. players
Sportspeople from Fairfax, Virginia
Soccer players from Maryland
Association football forwards
American soccer players
American expatriate soccer players
American expatriate soccer players in Germany
Expatriate footballers in Germany
American expatriate sportspeople in Ireland
Expatriate association footballers in the Republic of Ireland
Chantilly High School alumni